Jewel Quest is a tile-matching puzzle video game created and published by iWin. First released for Windows, it has been redeveloped for Symbian S60, the Nintendo DS (as Jewel Quest: Expeditions), the Xbox 360's Xbox Live Arcade and other platforms. iWin also released a series of sequels and spin-off games.

Gameplay 
Jewel Quest is a "match 3" puzzle played on a grid filled with various tokens, such as diamonds, gold nuggets, coins, and skulls. The player may swap any two adjacent tiles, as long as the swap results in a horizontal or vertical line of three or more matching tokens. The matched set disappears, allowing tokens to drop into the gaps from above; if more matched sets form as a result, they disappear as well.

Whenever tiles disappear, the background grid positions turn gold. The player must turn every square on the board to gold in order to complete the level. Failing to do so within the given time limit, or reaching a situation in which no more swaps are possible, costs one life and sends the player back to the start of that level.

As the game progresses, new variations are introduced to make gameplay increasingly difficult: irregularly-shaped grids, squares in hard-to-reach places, tokens that must be matched multiple times to clear them from the board, etc.

Jewel Quest
Jewel Quest has 180 levels and is set within the Mayan culture. There are 36 grids and they are played through, in succession, five times, with each play-through adding a new level of difficulty. During the first run-through, "Explorer," the player is given pieces of storyline in the form of "journal entries" to read after completing each grid, with an additional snippet before the beginning of each level. After playing the 36th grid, the totem "speaks" in addition to there being a written blurb. After the "Explorer" level, new information is given only at the end of the 36th level, and once after playing the 1-2 grid during the second run-through. All other "journal entries" are quotes or sayings to encourage the player. Likewise, if the player fails to complete a level within the time frame, encouraging quotes will be used.

Jewel Quest II
Jewel Quest II has 180 levels. After each level, the player advances along a map representing a journey in Africa. Additional jewels are added. Again, there are 36 boards to play, with each play-through increasing in difficulty. For Jewel Quest II, the boards are not necessarily the same as in the previous play-through. Also, while in the original Jewel Quest, blank squares are obstacles, the player is allowed to move jewels into empty squares in the grid in Jewel Quest II, introducing new strategy. The player's character is revealed to be named Rupert Pack, and the story revolves around him searching for a "Legendary Jewel Board" in Africa, as well as a romantic subplot with a woman named "Emma Swimmingly" and a villain named "Sebastian Grenard." Emma and Sebastian each receive their own first-person text entries for an entire play-through, though the final play-through is given by Rupert. The background reflects the location of the characters within the story.

Jewel Quest III
Jewel Quest III's levels range throughout the world. The new globe interface allows the player to select from different regions to play.  Central America, South America, Iceland, Europe, Africa, China, East Asia, Australia, Pacific Northwest, and The Hawaiian Islands are the regions. In each region, there are several locations to choose from and each level has multiple passes. New to Jewel Quest III is that some of the jewels have special properties.

Scoring and lives 

When a set of tiles are matched, points are gained based on the number of tiles matched and the number of "cascaded" matches that have occurred. "Cursed" black tiles appear in later levels; directly matching a set of these deducts points and erases the gold behind them. However, the cursed tiles can be safely removed through a "cascaded" match.

If the player runs out of time on a level, or reaches a point where there are no moves possible, they lose a life and must start the level over.

An additional life is granted for every 50,000 points earned.

Games 

The Jewel Quest series has evolved since its beginnings starting with Match 3 games, and later including playing card games and hidden object games, starting on PC and later porting to consoles and mobile devices.

Windows

Match 3

Playing card

Hidden object

Consoles

Mobile

External links 
 Official iWin website
 VGT review of Nintendo DS version of Jewel Quest: Expeditions 
 Website of the game itself

References

2004 video games
MacOS games
Mobile games
Nintendo DS games
Windows games
Xbox 360 Live Arcade games
Casual games
Video games developed in the United States
Tile-matching video games